Chris Ruppenthal (born as John Christian Ruppenthal on June 1, 1955) is an American television and film writer based in Hollywood, California.

Life and career

Born and raised in Coral Gables, Florida, Ruppenthal received an A.B. Degree from Harvard University in 1976 where he was an Editor of the Harvard Lampoon as well as a member of The Delphic Club and The Hasty Pudding where he performed in three of the famous Hasty Pudding travesty musicals.  Following Harvard he worked for a time in New York City in advertising before moving to California to pursue a writing career.  He received an M.A. degree from the USC Film School.

Amongst his vast resume as a television producer, Ruppenthal has served as a producer/co-producer for the NBC-TV series Quantum Leap, as co-executive producer of The Outer Limits and Silk Stalkings (which he also wrote scripts for) TV series, also as supervising producer of ABC-TV's Lois & Clark: The New Adventures of Superman (of also he wrote episodes for), CBS-TV's Touched by an Angel, Harts of the West and Covington Cross; and has writing credits for Blade: The Series, Avalon: Beyond the Abyss, NBC's The Pretender, FOX-TV's The X-Files, CBS-TV's Touched by an Angel, Harts of the West, The Adventures of Brisco County, Jr., Covington Cross, ABC-TV's Moonlighting,  Sledge Hammer! and Max Headroom''.

Personal life
Ruppenthal currently resides in Baltimore, where he continues to write for television and Works for LAUSD at Berendo Middle Schoolin (the Pico-Union District) and the UCLA Extension School.

Filmography

References

External links

Chris Ruppenthal bio at UCLA Extension weblink (UCLAExtension.edu)
Writer's Guild West

1955 births
Living people
American television directors
American television producers
American male screenwriters
Film directors from Florida
USC School of Cinematic Arts alumni
The Harvard Lampoon alumni
Hasty Pudding alumni
Screenwriters from Florida